The 2015 Grand Prix Cycliste de Québec was the sixth edition of the Grand Prix Cycliste de Québec one-day cycling race. It took place on 11 September and was the twenty-fifth race of the 2015 UCI World Tour. The race was won by Rigoberto Urán.

Teams
As the Grand Prix Cycliste de Québec was a UCI World Tour event, all 17 UCI ProTeams were invited automatically and obligated to send a squad. Three UCI Professional Continental teams (Bora-Argon 18, Drapac, and Team Europcar) and a Canadian national squad also competed in the race, and as such, forming the event's 21-team peloton.

The 21 teams that competed in the race were:

Canada (national team) †

Results

External links

References

Grand Prix Cycliste de Québec
Grand Prix Cycliste de Quebec
Grand Prix Cycliste de Quebec
2015 in Quebec
September 2015 sports events in Canada